Jason Douglas (born February 6, 1980) is a Canadian boxer who won gold at the 2002 Commonwealth Games in the heavyweight 91 kg/201 lbs limit division.

Amateur
In Manchester 2002 he beat David Haye, Shane Cameron, and Kertson Manswell in the final  20-13 for the Commonwealth title.

He also earned a bronze medal at the PanAm Games 2003 in Santo Domingo after losing to world champion Odlanier Solis 2:16.

His amateur record was 88 bouts, with 76 wins (26 by TKO).

Pro
Currently fighting in the light heavyweight division.

References
Commonwealth 2002
PanAm Games

1980 births
Living people
Commonwealth Games gold medallists for Canada
Boxers at the 2002 Commonwealth Games
Boxers at the 2003 Pan American Games
Canadian male boxers
Pan American Games bronze medalists for Canada
Commonwealth Games medallists in boxing
Sportspeople from Kitchener, Ontario
Pan American Games medalists in boxing
Heavyweight boxers
Medalists at the 2003 Pan American Games
20th-century Canadian people
21st-century Canadian people
Medallists at the 2002 Commonwealth Games